Ebrahimabad-e Jadid may refer to:
 Ebrahimabad-e Jadid, Ardabil
 Ebrahimabad-e Jadid, Kerman